Baroa siamica is a noctuoid moth in the family Erebidae, subfamily Arctiinae. It is found in Thailand, Sundaland and Luzon in the Philippines. The habitat consists of lower and upper montane forests and lowland dipterocarp forests.

Adults have dark brownish grey forewings and blackish hindwings. Adults have been recorded on wing in June, from September to October and in November.

Subspecies
Baroa siamica siamica (Thailand, Sundaland, Philippines)
Baroa siamica javanica Kalis, 1934 (Java)
Baroa siamica maramaga Černý, 2010 (Philippines: Mindanao)

References

Arctiinae
Moths of Borneo
Moths described in 1911